The flecked pikeblenny (Chaenopsis roseola) is a species of chaenopsid blenny found around the United States in the western Atlantic ocean. It can reach a maximum length of  SL.

References
Notes

Bibliography
 Hastings, P. A. and R. L. Shipp  1981 (16 Jan.) A new species of pikeblenny (Pisces: Chaenopsidae: Chaenopsis) from the western Atlantic. Proceedings of the Biological Society of Washington v. 93 (no. 4): 875–886.

roseola
Fish of the Eastern United States
freckled pikeblenny